Queen's Hotel or The Queen's Hotel may refer to:

Australia 
 Queen's Hotel, Townsville

Canada 
 Queen's Hotel, Toronto

Sri Lanka 
 Queen's Hotel, Kandy

United Kingdom 
Queen's Hotel, Aberystwyth, now known as Swyddfa'r Sir
The Queens, Crouch End, London, formerly The Queen's Hotel
Queen's Hotel, Primrose Hill, London
Queen's Hotel, Gibraltar
Queen's Hotel, Kirn
Queens Hotel, Leeds
Queens Hotel, Southsea
The Queen's Hotel, Queen's Promenade, Douglas, Isle of Man, one of Isle of Man's Registered Buildings